Suralaya Power Station is a coal-fired power station located on Cilegon, Banten in Indonesia.  The station has a maximum generating capacity of 4,025 megawatts.

History 
The power station project was built in four steps and now has eight units. 
Step 1 = 2x400 MW operated in 1984
Step 2 = 2x400 MW operated in 1984
Step 3 = 3x600 MW operated in 1997
Step 4 = 1x625 MW operated in 2011

Step 1 with two units was built in 1984. Coal is the primary fuel used in this unit.  
Units 5,6,7 and 8 were built in 1997 and 2011, this is the newest and most efficient unit at Suralaya Power Station. It is able to burn a wide variety of fuels like natural gas, heavy fuel oil, straw, wood pellets and sugarcane in the same burners. The plant facilities can transfer 900 tons of wood pellets per hour from ship to shore, although some environmentalists question the benefits of biomass. As a by-product, high quality plaster is made when cleaning the flue gas.

Power lines 

The power plant connects to the industrial and metropolitan area using 500 kV and 150 kV transmission lines.

See also

 Fossil fuel power plant

References

Coal-fired power stations in Indonesia